Hedayati (literally "directional", "directorial") is a Persian and Dari surname. Notable people with the surname include:
Hamid Hedayati (born 1976), Iranian footballer
Hossein Hedayati, Iranian businessman
Kamran Hedayati (1949–1996), Iranian Kurdish dissident
Mohammad-Reza Hedayati, Iranian actor
Saed Hedayati (born 1955), Iranian actor

References

Persian-language surnames
Dari-language surnames